The helmet toktokkies (genus Ocnodes) are ground-dwelling, Afrotropical beetles in the family Tenebrionidae.

Species
The species include:
 Ocnodes argenteofasciatum Koch C3
 Ocnodes benguelense Koch C2
 Ocnodes cardiopterus Fairmaire LMH 1888
 Ocnodes cinerarium Koch C2
 Ocnodes cordiventre Haag-Rutenberg JG 1871
 Ocnodes dubiosum Péringuey LA 1899
 Ocnodes erichsoni Haag-Rutenberg JG 1871
 Ocnodes fistucans Koch C2
 Ocnodes gibberosulum Péringuey 1908
 Ocnodes granisterna Koch C2
 Ocnodes granulosicollis  
 Ocnodes imbricatum Koch C2
 Ocnodes kulzeri Koch C2
 Ocnodes martinsi Koch C2
 Ocnodes mendicum Péringuey LA 1899
 Ocnodes mendicum estermanni Koch C2
 Ocnodes notata (Thunberg, 1787)
 Ocnodes osbecki (Billberg 1815)
 Ocnodes pachysoma Péringuey LA 1892
 Ocnodes pachysoma ornata Koch C2
 Ocnodes punctipenne Harold von E 1879
 Ocnodes rikaae Koch
 Ocnodes semiscaber Haag-Rutenberg
 Ocnodes sericolle Koch 1952
 Ocnodes spinigerum Koch C2
 Ocnodes tarsocnoides Koch C2
 Ocnodes tenebrosum Erichson WF 1843
 Ocnodes tenebrosum melanarium Haag-Rutenberg JG 1871
 Ocnodes vaticinus Péringuey LA 1899
 Ocnodes virago Koch

References

External links

Pimeliinae
Tenebrionidae genera